Proto-Abkhaz-Abaza (or Proto-Abazgi) is the reconstructed common ancestor of the Abkhaz and Abaza languages.

Phonology

Consonants 
The consonant system is reconstructed with a four-way phonation contrast in stops and affricates, and a two-way contrast in fricatives.

Below is the table of Proto-Abazgi Alphabet :

 In some Abaza dialects the velar consonants turned to uvular consonants.

The most noticeable changes are:
 The velar consonants become uvular consonants in Abkhaz languages.

Grammar

See also

 Proto-Circassian language
 Proto-Northwest Caucasian language

References

STAROSTIN, Sergei A.; NIKOLAYEV, Sergei L. (1994). A North Caucasian Etymological Dictionary: Preface.

External links
 Word lists for Abkhaz
Abaza basic lexicon at the Global Lexicostatistical Database

Abazgi
Northwest Caucasian languages